Supermarket is the only soundtrack album by American rapper Logic. It was released on March 26, 2019, by Def Jam Recordings and Visionary Music Group. The soundtrack serves as a tie-in for the novel of the same name. The soundtrack was released to negative reviews by music critics, and it peaked at number 56 on the Billboard 200.

Promotion 
The release date was announced on January 10, 2019.

Reception

The album received generally negative reviews. Danny Schwartz, writing for Rolling Stone, characterized Supermarket as "uniquely bad", "bold yet bland" and a "suite of vapid love songs". Reed Jackson of Pitchfork described it as "a painful journey across guitar music of the past five decades." Calum Slingerland of Exclaim! negatively reviewed both the album and the accompanying novel, stating that "those who aren't card-carrying Rattpack devotees will come away with little to chew on".

The album peaked at number 56 on the Billboard 200, with 11,823 total album-equivalent units, 2,947 of which were pure album sales.

Track listing 
Credits adapted from Tidal.

Notes
 "Bohemian Trapsody" features additional vocals by Arkae Tuazon, Damian Lemar Hudson, Jairus Leon Gay and John Lindahl
 "Can I Kick It" features background vocals by Alec Schweitzer, Arjun Ivatury, Damian Lemar Hudson, Jairus Leon Gay, John Lindahl, Jordan Harris, José Araujo, Leon Ressalam, and Tomo Milicevic
 Lou Reed is credited as the sole songwriter of "Can I Kick It" on streaming services
 "Time Machine" features background vocals by Damian Lemar Hudson, Jairus Leon Gay and John Lindahl
 "Supermarket" features background vocals by Damian Lemar Hudson
 "Baby" features background vocals by Arkae Tuazon, Damian Lemar Hudson, Jairus Leon Gay
 "Lemon Drop" features background vocals by Will Wells
 "I Love You Forever" features background vocals by Arkae Tuazon

Sample credits
 "Can I Kick It" contains an interpolation of "Can I Kick It?", performed by A Tribe Called Quest.
 "Baby" contains an interpolation of "Just a Friend", performed by Biz Markie.

Charts

References 

2019 soundtrack albums
Alternative rock albums by American artists
Book soundtracks
Def Jam Recordings albums
Logic (rapper) albums